HMS Port d'Espagne was a 14-gun vessel, variously described as a sloop, gun-brig or schooner, built in 1806 in Trinidad, whose citizens presented her to the crown. She captured several small Spanish privateers and participated in a major campaign before she was sold in 1811.

Career
Lieutenant James Pattison Stewart was appointed acting commander of Port d'Espagne on the Trinidad station on 15 April 1806.

On 27 February 1807 Port d'Espagne and the brig  captured the brig Altrevido, Nichola Val Pardo, master. The schooner  shared by agreement in the prize money due Express.

Three months later, on 6 June, 25 men from Port d'Espagne, under the command of Lieutenant Hall, succeeded in capturing the Spanish privateer schooner Mercedes in the Gulf of Paria. Mercedes was armed with two guns and two swivel guns, and had a crew of 30 men. Hall used a captured Spanish schooner disguised as a neutral vessel to get close to the Mercedes. The British came alongside, under fire, and captured the Mercedes after a brief fight. British casualties were two men wounded; Spanish casualties were two killed, one drowned, and three wounded.

On 18 August Stewart and Port d'Espagne succeeded in capturing the Spanish privateer schooner Maria after a six-hour chase. She was armed with one long 18-pounder gun, had a crew of 74 men, was provisioned for a three-month cruise, and had left Margarita intending to cruise windward of Barbados. Stewart was particularly pleased to capture Maria as she was fast sailer in the Windward Islands and although on this cruise she had not made any captures, her captain had 14 years of successes in other privateers. Two days later, Ballahoo's boats, with the assistance of Maria, destroyed a small privateer in the Bay of San Juan.

Port d'Espagne and Ballahoo  captured another small privateer, Rosario, on 12 September in the same bay. Rosario also was armed with one gun, and had a crew of 34, all of whom escaped on shore. Prize and head money for Mercede, Rosario, and the unnamed privateer were paid some 21 years later.

Lastly, Port d'Espagna chased a privateer out of the Gulf of Paria and into the arms of the brig , which captured the Spaniard on 17 October. The Spanish privateer, of two guns, was the Nuestra Senora del Carmen.

In late 1808 Stewart transferred to Snap, which he commissioned on 13 November.

Port d'Espagne participated in the British capture of the French and Dutch West Indies, including the capture of Martinique in February 1809.  In 1847 the Admiralty authorized the issue of the Naval General Service Medal with the clasp "Martinique" to all remaining surviving claimants of that campaign.

Lieutenant Colin Campbell was appointed to the command of Port d'Espagne on 22 September 1809. His replacement, by exchange, was Lieutenant Donald Campbell, who assumed command on 29 March 1810, and left on 22 September.

On 21 October 1810, Lieutenant George Guy Burton became acting captain (pro tem) of Port d'Espagne. Commander James Black was promoted to Port d'Espagne with a commission dated 8 September 1810. It is not clear when he actually took command.

Fate
Port d'Espagne was sold in 1811.

Notes

Citations

References
 
 
 
 
 
 
 
 

1806 ships
Brigs of the Royal Navy
Schooners of the Royal Navy
Sloops of the Royal Navy